Jamesville can refer to 
Jamesville, New York
Jamesville, North Carolina
Jamesville, Pennsylvania
Jamesville, Virginia
Hamilton, Ontario has a neighborhood called Jamesville
Yankton County, South Dakota has a township called Jamesville

See also
Janesville (disambiguation)